Ayet Atyap Annual Cultural Festival (Tyap:  or ) is an age-long chain of festive activities and ceremonies observed by the Atyap people of Southern Kaduna, Middle Belt Nigeria. It was traditionally carried out to usher in the farming season for the year between mid-March and mid-April and was organized by male members, the Aku clan who have already been initiated into the Abwoi cult. Of recent, the event has been shifted to December and celebrated in the Agwatyap's palace square in Atak Njei, Zangon Kataf LGA, southern Kaduna State. It is usually well attended by important guests from within and outside the state, including political and traditional leaders.

Gallery

See also
 Afan festival
 Festivals in Nigeria

References

Cultural festivals in Nigeria
Annual events in Nigeria